Michael Lieber is a British novelist, essayist and short story writer. Lieber's novels are The War Hero, The Boy and the Goldlock and Helga Dune.

He has also appeared in films. His first film was in the 2013 biopic Ramanujan, a period drama set in 1914 about the life of mathematician Srinivasa Ramanujan. Lieber played mathematician John Edensor Littlewood, starring alongside Kevin Mcgowan, Cloudia Swann, and Richard Walsh. When preparing to play the part, he spoke to professor Béla Bollobás who had worked with Littlewood.

In 2010, he starred as the over-the-hill footballer Ray Keane in the play Transfer Deadline Day at the Courtyard Theater, London, England.
In 2017 he played the lead role of Mark Crowe in the psychological thriller A Room To Die For alongside Vas Blackwood.

Early life

1998-2001

When Lieber was a child he was severely illiterate. In 1998, when he was aged 10, he was sent to attend schooling at the Maple Hayes School for Dyslexia in Lichfield, Staffordshire, England.

Maple Hayes was run by its father and son team, Dr Neville Brown and Dr Daryl Brown, who taught Lieber a new and revolutionary method of reading and writing called morpheme, also known as icon therapy. Lieber has stated that, although icon therapy is widely acknowledged now, it was originally only used on foreigners looking to learn English.

In 2018, Lieber dedicated his debut novel The War Hero to Maple Hayes Hall as well as the two Doctors, with the added inscription 'thank you for the icons'  

While living in Wales, aged 11, Lieber would perform magic tricks on the street to make up his pocket money. When Lieber was aged 13 in 2001, he appeared in a musical adaptation of the Charles Dickens classic 'Oliver Twist' at the Garrick Theatre, he played one of Fagin’s boys. 

On the subject of Acting, Lieber has remarked that it is a career and vocation that has ups and downs as well as being a very noble profession. This early involvement in the theatre would later lead to a brief enrolment to The Oxford School of Drama.

Career

The War Hero
Lieber's debut novel was the allegory thriller The War Hero, which was published on the 13th December 2018 by British Cultural. Set in the 1920s, The War Hero took five years to complete and features many descriptions of the English countryside. Some notable locations used for inspiration include Up Holland and Aylesbury Vale. Notes from Lieber's travel diary were incorporated into the novel.

The story focuses on a sixty-five year old man celebrating his birthday at his country house. Slowly but surely, he realises one of the guests is not known to the others nor to him. When confronted in private, the guest explains he has been hired to murder him but allows the man to enjoy his party provided he agrees to meet him at the end of the evening.

I wanted to make sure the book would age well. I’m an avid reader and I’m very conscious of novels that don’t hold up well because they’re too topical. I wanted to make sure what I wrote about would continue to be relatable.

Lieber has identified that the novel is an allegorical story with hidden levels of meaning for readers who want to dig deeper in to the narrative. Two important allegory’s Lieber drew inspiration from while writing The War Hero, were William Golding's The Lord of the Flies and George Orwell's Animal Farm.

Bibliography

Novels
 2018 – The War Hero (1-5272-3346-4)
 2021 – The Boy and the Goldlock (1-9196-1620-9)
 2022 – Helga Dune (1-9196-1623-3)

Short Stories
 2020 – Elle's Logic (features in The Boy and the Goldlock,1-8382-1870-X)

Essays and Non-fiction
 2022 – The London Riots of 2011: An Eyewitness Account (1-9196-1626-8)

References

External links
 Michael Lieber at The Internet Movie Database

1988 births
Living people
Welsh male film actors
British male film actors
20th-century British male actors
21st-century British male actors
British male stage actors